Curious George Goes to Town was a children's water play and ball play area at Universal Studios Florida and Universal Studios Hollywood. 

The Florida attraction originally opened in 1998, on the former site of The Bates Mansion Set used in Psycho IV: The Beginning.  On November 1, 2022, Universal Studios Florida has announced that the area, alongside Fievel's Playland, DreamWorks Destination, Woody Woodpecker's Nuthouse Coaster, and Shrek and Donkey's Meet and Greet would close permanently on January 16, 2023, with its last day of operation scheduled for January 15, 2023. It was rumored that the area will be re-themed to DreamWorks’s Kung Fu Panda.

A similar attraction, named The Adventures of Curious George opened in March 2008 at Universal Studios Hollywood, replacing the Nickelodeon Blast Zone. On September 6, 2013, the attraction was closed to make way for The Wizarding World of Harry Potter.

References

Amusement rides based on book franchises
Amusement rides introduced in 1998
Amusement rides that closed in 2023
Amusement rides introduced in 2008
Curious George
Universal Parks & Resorts attractions by name
Former Universal Studios Hollywood attractions
Universal Studios Florida
Water rides manufactured by WhiteWater West
Amusement rides manufactured by Prime Interactives
1998 establishments in Florida
2023 disestablishments in Florida